William Ulick Tristram St Lawrence, 4th Earl of Howth KP (25 June 1827 – 9 March 1909) was an Irish peer, styled Viscount St Lawrence until 1874. He became Earl of Howth in 1874 on the death of his father, Thomas St Lawrence, 3rd Earl of Howth, and was appointed a Knight of the Order of St Patrick on 8 May 1884. His mother was Thomas's first wife Lady Emily de Burgh, daughter of John de Burgh, 13th Earl of Clanricarde.

He became a captain in the 7th Queen's Own Hussars 1847. He was High Sheriff of County Dublin in 1854. He sat in the English House of Commons as a Liberal MP for Galway Borough from 1868 to 1874. He was State Steward to the Viceroy of Ireland from 1855 to 1858.

He died at a Bournemouth hotel aged 81, unmarried. The family titles became extinct on his death as he had no male heir.

References

External links 
 

1827 births
1909 deaths
Knights of St Patrick
St Lawrence, William St Lawrence, Viscount
St Lawrence, William St Lawrence, Viscount
UK MPs who inherited peerages
UK MPs who were granted peerages
Place of birth missing
Place of death missing
Peers of the United Kingdom created by Queen Victoria
Earls of Howth